Paulina is an unincorporated community and census-designated place in St. James Parish, Louisiana, United States. Its population was 1,178 as of the 2010 census. The community is located on the east bank of the Mississippi River in the eastern part of the parish, west of Lutcher and across the river from Vacherie. Paulina has a post office with ZIP code 70763.

Demographics

References

Unincorporated communities in St. James Parish, Louisiana
Unincorporated communities in Louisiana
Census-designated places in St. James Parish, Louisiana
Census-designated places in Louisiana